Tú was a Canadian pop music duo from the Toronto area in the 1980s, featuring twin sisters Amanda and Cassandra DiBlasi.

History
The DiBlasi twins appeared on The Tommy Hunter Show in 1985.
They released a self-titled album in 1987 on RCA Records.
Their second album, Secrets in the Dark, was released in 1989 by Columbia Records.

Their biggest hit, the single "Stay with Me", was their only Top 10 song, reaching number 8 on the Canadian music charts in 1987. They also released the singles "I Used to Cry", "Language of Love", "Stop Breaking My Heart", and "Le Freak - Tú Freak", a cover version of the 1978 Chic song "Le Freak".

Tú also appeared as backup singers in Platinum Blonde's video for "Fire".

References

External links
 Tú fansite

Canadian pop music groups
Canadian girl groups
Canadian dance music groups
Twin musical duos
Musical groups established in 1987
Canadian musical duos
Female musical duos
Canadian twins